Code of the Saddle is a 1947 American Western film directed by Thomas Carr and written by Eliot Gibbons. The film stars Johnny Mack Brown, Raymond Hatton, Riley Hill, Kay Morley, William Bailey and Zon Murray. The film was released on June 28, 1947, by Monogram Pictures.

Plot

Cast          
Johnny Mack Brown as John Macklin
Raymond Hatton as Winks
Riley Hill as Bill Stace
Kay Morley as Bess Bentham
William Bailey as Sheriff Wallace 
Zon Murray as Deputy Rubio
Ted Adams as Buck Stace
Bud Osborne as Stubby 
Craig Duncan as Crooked Deputy 
Gary Garrett as Randall

References

External links
 

1947 films
American Western (genre) films
1947 Western (genre) films
Monogram Pictures films
Films directed by Thomas Carr
American black-and-white films
1940s English-language films
1940s American films